Matt Stone is an American politician. He serves as a Republican member for the 2nd district of the Arkansas Senate.

Life and career 
Stone attended the University of Arkansas at Monticello and the University of Arkansas.

In May 2022, Stone defeated Beth Callaway and James McMenis in the Republican primary election for the 2nd district of the Arkansas Senate. In  November 2022, he defeated Garry Smith in the general election, winning 67 percent of the votes. He assumed office in 2023.

References 

 

Living people
Year of birth missing (living people)
Place of birth missing (living people)
Republican Party Arkansas state senators
21st-century American politicians
University of Arkansas at Monticello alumni
University of Arkansas alumni